Eternal Nightmare is the debut album by the San Francisco Bay Area thrash metal band Vio-lence. It was released on June 27, 1988 through MCA Records' Mechanic sublabel. A limited 10" promo single was released, with two tracks "Eternal Nightmare" and "Phobophobia"; the release was quite unique, as it came in a sealed plastic cover, containing (fake) vomit. Shortly after, thrash metal innovators Slayer released a single in a similar format but with fake blood, and rock band The Revolting Cocks released a single with fake semen.

The 2005 re-release of the album includes a bonus CD of the Thrash of the Titans concert (benefit for Testament singer Chuck Billy), recorded August 11, 2001.

Track listing 
All songs written by Sean Killian, Phil Demmel and Robb Flynn.

Bonus disc

Personnel 
Sean Killian – lead vocals
Phil Demmel – lead guitar, backing vocals
Robb Flynn – rhythm guitar, backing vocals
Deen Dell – bass, backing vocals
Perry Strickland – drums

Production
Produced, recorded, engineered, edited and mixed by John Cuniberti
Second engineers: Casey McMakin and David Plank

References 

1988 albums
Albums with cover art by Ed Repka
Vio-lence albums